Polgár or Polgar may refer to:

Polgár, Hungary, a city in Hungary

Persons with the surname 
 Alfred Polgar (1873–1955), Austrian journalist
 Franz Polgar (1900–1979), Hungarian psychologist, hypnotist, lecturer and entertainer
 Gyula Polgár (1912–1992), Hungarian footballer
 François Polgár (born 1946), French choir conductor
 Jorge Polgar (born 1967), Uruguayan economist
 László Polgár (born 1946), Jewish Hungarian chess teacher, father of the Polgár sisters
 The Polgár sisters, three chess players who are siblings:
 Susan Polgar (born 1969), Hungarian-American chess player
 Sofia Polgar (born 1974), Hungarian-Israeli chess player
 Judit Polgár (born 1976), Hungarian chess player
 László Polgár (bass) (1947–2010), Hungarian operatic bass singer
 Peter Polgár (born 1976), Slovak footballer
 Thomas Polgar (1922-2014), Hungarian-American CIA officer

Hungarian words and phrases
Hungarian-language surnames
Jewish surnames